Just the Beginning may refer to:

Film and Television
Just the Beginning (German "...und das ist erst der Anfang") 2000 film directed by Pierre Franckh
Just the Beginning Valemont  TV Episode 2009 Nikki Blonsky, Kristen Hager, Jessica Parker Kennedy.

Music

Albums
Just the Beginning (Margo Smith & Holly album), 1991
Just the Beginning (Voices album), 1992
Just the Beginning (One Voice album), 1999
Just the Beginning (Grace VanderWaal album), 2017
Just the Beginning, album by Kurt Carr 2008
Just the Beginning, album by Phillip Mitchell 2004

Songs
"Just the Beginning", song by John Holt
"Just the Beginning", song by band Europe composed by Joey Tempest / Kee Marcello from Europe album Out of This World, 1988	
"Just the Beginning", song by Voices from their 1992 album Just the Beginning
"Just the Beginning", by The Game from his 2004 album Untold Story